Monica Gunning (born 1930) is a Jamaican American children's book author and poet. Her work deals with both the Caribbean of her childhood and the immigrant experience.

Biography 
Gunning was born in Jamaica in 1930. She moved to New York City at age 18. There, she studied at the City University of New York.

Her first book of poetry for children, Not a Copper Penny in Me House: Poems from the Caribbean, was published in 1993, with illustrations by Frané Lessac. The anthology of 15 poems about Jamaican culture received a commendation from the Américas Awards for children's and young adult literature.

Subsequent works included Under the Breadfruit Tree: Island Poems (1998) and America, My New Home (2004). Gunning brings her own experience as both a child in Jamaica and a young immigrant to the United States to her work.

Her 2004 book about a girl and her mother dealing with homelessness, A Shelter in Our Car, was developed in collaboration with the Homeless Children's Network in San Francisco. It received a Skipping Stones Honor Award in 2005 and an honorable mention from the Gustavus Myers Outstanding Book Awards in 2004.

A Shelter in Our Car was adapted into a children's musical by the New York theater company Making Books Sing in 2007.

Gunning also holds a master's in education from Mount St. Mary's College in Los Angeles and has studied at the University of Guadalajara. She had a long career as an elementary school educator, working for many years as a bilingual teacher in Los Angeles and teaching English as a second language. She was also a training teacher at the University of Southern California and the University of California, Los Angeles.

Selected works 

 Not a Copper Penny in Me House (1993)
 Under the Breadfruit Tree (1998)
 America, My New Home (2004)
 A Shelter in Our Car (2004)

External links 

 Monica Gunning at WorldCat

References 

1930 births
American writers of Jamaican descent
American women children's writers
American children's writers
Jamaican children's writers
Jamaican women children's writers
American women poets
Jamaican women poets
City University of New York alumni
Living people
20th-century American women writers
20th-century Jamaican women writers
21st-century American women writers
21st-century Jamaican women writers
20th-century American poets
20th-century Jamaican poets
Mount St. Mary's University (Los Angeles) alumni
University of Southern California faculty
University of California, Los Angeles faculty
American women academics